The wood stork (Mycteria americana) is a large American wading bird in the family Ciconiidae (storks), the only member of the family to breed in North America. It was formerly called the "wood ibis", though it is not an ibis. It is found in subtropical and tropical habitats in the Americas, including the Caribbean. In South America, it is resident, but in North America, it may disperse as far as Florida. Originally described by Carl Linnaeus in 1758, this stork likely evolved in tropical regions. The head and neck are bare of feathers, and dark grey in colour. The plumage is mostly white, with the exception of the tail and some of the wing feathers, which are black with a greenish-purplish sheen. The juvenile differs from the adult, with the former having a feathered head and a yellow bill, compared to the black adult bill. There is little sexual dimorphism.

The wood stork's habitat can vary, but it must have a tropical or subtropical climate with fluctuating water levels. The  nest is found in trees, especially mangroves and those of the genus Taxodium, usually surrounded by water or over water. The wood stork nests colonially. The nest itself is made from sticks and greenery. During the breeding season, which is initiated when the water levels decline and can occur anytime between November and August, a single clutch of three to five eggs is laid. These are incubated for around 30 days, and the chicks hatch underdeveloped, or altricial, requiring support from their parents. They fledge 60 to 65 days after hatching, although only about 31% of nests fledge a chick in any given year, with most chicks dying during their first two weeks, despite being watched by an adult during that time. The chicks are fed fish of increasing size. The diet of the adult changes throughout the year. During the dry season, fish and insects are eaten, compared to the addition of frogs and crabs during the wet season. Because it forages by touch, it needs shallow water to effectively catch food. This is also the reason why the wood stork breeds when water levels start to fall.

Globally, the wood stork is considered to be of least concern by the International Union for Conservation of Nature. This is due to its large range. In the United States, on the other hand, it is considered to be threatened. Predators of the wood stork include raccoons (which predate on chicks), crested caracaras, which prey on eggs, and other birds of prey, which feed on eggs and chicks. Hunting and egg-collecting by humans has been implicated as a factor in the decline of South American wood storks. Habitat alteration has caused the wood stork to decline, with levee and drainage systems in the Everglades causing a shift in the timing of breeding and thus a decrease in breeding success.

Taxonomy and etymology 
The wood stork was first formally given its binomial name Mycteria americana by Linnaeus in 1758. Linnaeus based his name on a misplaced account and illustration in Historia Naturalis Brasiliae (1648) of the jabiru-guacu. Linnaeus also described Tantalus loculator, which was proven to also apply to the jabiru-guacu, after M. americana based on a 1731 illustration of the wood stork by Mark Catesby under the name of wood pelican. Since these binomials referred to the same species, M. americana and T. loculator are synonymous but M. americana takes priority as it occurs before T. loculator. 

The accepted genus name Mycteria derives from the Greek μυκτήρ : myktēr,  meaning snout or trunk, and the species name americana references the distribution of this stork.

This species seems to have evolved in tropical regions; its North American presence probably postdates the last ice age. A fossil fragment from the Touro Passo Formation found at Arroio Touro Passo (Rio Grande do Sul, Brazil) might be of the living species; it is at most from the Late Pleistocene age, a few 10,000s of years ago. North American fossils from that time are of an extinct larger relative, M. wetmorei, which would be distinguished from the wood on the basis of size and on the basis of M. wetmorei's less curved mandible. This was probably a sister species; both occurred sympatrically on Cuba at the end of the Pleistocene. Of the extant members of the genus Mycteria, this bird is basal to the clade yellow-billed stork, which is itself basal to the milky stork and the painted stork. This phylogeny is based on a 1996 study that sequenced the B chromosome and then utilized DNA–DNA hybridization to find the relations between the storks.

Likely because of its decurved bill, the wood stork has formerly been called the "wood ibis", although it is not an ibis. It also has been given the name of the "American wood stork", because it is found in the Americas. Regional names include "flinthead", "stonehead", "ironhead", "gourdhead", and "preacher".

Description 

The head and neck of the adult are bare, and the scaly skin is a dark grey. The black downward-curved bill is long and very wide at the base. The legs and feet are dark, and the flesh-coloured toes are pink during the breeding season. The sexes are similar.

Newly hatched chicks have a sparse coat of grey down that is replaced by a dense, wooly, and white down in about 10 days. Chicks grow fast, being about half the height of adults in three to four weeks. By the sixth and seventh weeks, the plumage on the head and neck turns smokey grey. When fledged, they resemble the adult, differing only in that they have a feathered head and a yellow bill.

Distribution and habitat 
This is a subtropical and tropical species which breeds in much of South America, Central America and the Caribbean. The wood stork is the only stork that breeds in North America. In the United States there are small breeding populations in Florida, Georgia, and the Carolinas. In South America, it is found south to northern Argentina. Some populations in North America disperse after breeding, frequently to South America.

This stork is able to adapt to a variety of tropical and subtropical wetland habitats having fluctuating water levels (as that initiates breeding). It nests in trees that are over water or surrounded by water. In freshwater habitats, it primarily nests in forests dominated by trees of the genus Taxodium (in the USA), while in estuaries, it generally nests on trees in the mangrove forests. To feed, the wood stork uses freshwater marshes in habitats with an abundance of Taxodium trees, while in areas with mangrove forests, it uses brackish water. Areas with more lakes attract feeding on lake, stream, and river edges.

Behaviour

Breeding 

A resident breeder in lowland wetlands with trees, the wood stork builds a large stick nest in a tree. In freshwater habitats, it prefers to nest in trees that are larger in diameter. It nests colonially, with up to 25 nests in one tree. On the tree itself, forks of large limbs or places where multiple branches cross are usually chosen.

The nest itself is built by the male from sticks and green twigs collected from the colony and the surrounding area. The greenery usually starts to be added before the eggs are laid but after the main structure of twigs is completed. The frequency at which it is added decreases after the eggs hatch. This greenery functions to help insulate the nest.

Wood storks without a nest occasionally try to take over others' nests. Such nest take-overs are performed by more than one bird. The young and eggs are thrown out of the nest within about 15 minutes. If only one stork is attending the nest when it is forced out, then it usually waits for its mate to try to take the nest back over.

Breeding is initiated by a drop in the water level combined with an increased density of fish (with the former likely triggering the latter). This is because a decrease in the water level and an increased density of fish allows for an adequate amount of food for the nestlings. This can occur anytime between November and August. After it starts, breeding takes about four months to complete.
These eggs are usually laid one to two days apart and incubated for 27 to 32 days by both sexes. This incubation period starts when the first egg is laid. During the first week of incubation, the parents do not go far from the colony, with the exception of the short trips to forage, drink, and collect nesting material carried out by the non-incubating bird. After the first week, the non-incubating bird spends less time in the colony, although the eggs are never left unattended. After a few hours of incubation, this bird sometimes takes a break to stretch, preen itself, rearrange nest material, or turn the eggs. The eggs hatch in the order in which they were laid, with an interval of a few days between when each egg hatches.

They are brooded for the first week after hatching, and after that when it is raining and at night. The chicks are not left alone until at least three weeks of age, with one parent foraging while the other guards the nest and chicks. When the chicks are at least three weeks old, they are large enough to stay and protect the nest. This coincides with the chicks getting more aggressive when presented with foreign objects or organisms. They fledge 60 to 65 days after hatching, and reach sexual maturity at four years of age, although they usually do not successfully fledge chicks until their fifth year of age.

The hatching success, the percentage of birds that had at least one egg that hatched in a year, of the wood stork is around 62%. This can vary widely, though, with colonies ranging from about 26% to 89% hatching success. The period when chicks are most vulnerable to death is from hatching to when they are two weeks old. Overall, about 31% of nests produce at least one fledged bird. Raccoons and caracaras, especially crested caracaras, are prominent predators of eggs and chicks. Other causes of nesting failure is the falling of nests, thus breaking the eggs inside. This can be caused by many events, the most prominent being poor nest construction and fights between adults.

Feeding 
During the dry season, the wood stork eats mostly fish, supplemented by insects. During the wet season, on the other hand, fish make up about half the diet, crabs make up about 30%, and insects and frogs make up the rest. The wood stork eats larger fish more often than smaller fish, even in some cases where the latter is more abundant.

The wood stork usually forages in flocks when not breeding, and alone and in small groups when it is breeding. In the dry season, the stork generally forages by slowly walking forward with its bill submerged in water while groping for food. During the wet season, this method is used about 40% of the time to catch food. During this period, foot stirring, where the stork walks very slowly with its bill in the water while pumping its foot up and down before every step, is used about 35% of the time. Both these hunting methods are non-visual.

Because of its non-visual foraging methods, the wood stork requires shallow water and a high density of fish to forage successfully.

Both parents feed the chicks by regurgitating food onto the nest floor. The amount of food that the chicks get changes over time, with more being fed daily from hatching to about 22 days, when food intake levels off. This continues until about 45 days, when food consumption starts to decrease. Overall, a chick eats about  before it fledges.

Flight 

When flying, this bird utilizes two different techniques. When it is not sufficiently warm and clear, such as in the late afternoon or on cloudy days, this stork alternates between flapping its wings and gliding for short periods of time. When it is warm and clear, this bird glides after it gains an altitude of at least  through continuously flapping its wings. It does not have to flap its wings during this time because the warm thermals are strong enough to support its weight. Because of the energy that is conserved by soaring, this stork usually uses this method to fly to more distant areas. It flies with its neck outstretched and its legs and feet trailing behind it.

Excretion and thermoregulation 

During the breeding season, the wood stork commonly defecates over the edge of its nest, while the chicks usually defecate inside. The method of defecation of the adult differs based on temperature. Normally, it excretes by leaning forward and slightly raising its tail, with the waste either going straight down or slightly backward. When it is hot, though, the adult takes a different position, quickly moving its tail downwards and forwards while twisting its body around to aim at a leg that is bent backward (this is called urohidrosis). Which leg is aimed at is alternated. The excrement aimed at the legs is fluid and watery. It generally hits the legs around the middle of the unfeathered tibia, and runs down the leg as it is being directed by the scales. This results in evaporation, making this a method of thermoregulation. In hot weather, breeding adults will also shade their chicks with their wings.

Predators and parasites 

Raccoons are predators of wood stork chicks, especially during dry periods where the water beneath nesting trees dries up. Where it occurs, the crested caracara is a significant predator of eggs. Other caracaras, and hawks and vultures, also prey on both eggs and chicks.

In the United States, Haemoproteus crumenium, a blood protozoan, can be found in subadult and adult wood storks. Other species of Haemoproteus also infect wood storks in Costa Rica, in addition to Syncuaria mycteriae, a nematode found in the gizzard of the wood stork.

Status 
Globally, the wood stork is considered least concern by the International Union for Conservation of Nature due to its large range. In the United States, this bird is considered to be threatened. This is a recovery from its former status as endangered, which it held from 1984 to 2014 because of a decline in its population caused by habitat loss and drought. Similarly, in the state of Santa Catarina, Brazil, its decline seems to have been reversed: after an absence between the late 1960s and the mid-1990s, the species is now again regularly encountered there, in particular in the Tubarão River region. It is likely that the Paraná River region's wetlands served as a stronghold of the species, from where it is now re-colonizing some of its former haunts.

Threats 
Disturbance by tourists can have an effect on nesting success, with a study finding that nests that had boats passing by them within about  had an average of 0.1 chicks fledging, compared to the normal rate for that area of about 0.9 chicks fledging per nest. Pedestrians watching from a distance of at least  did not significantly affect nesting success. In the Everglades, levee and drainage systems have caused the timing of water fluctuations to change, thus shifting the timing of nesting and consequently a decrease in population.

References

External links

 
 Wood stork – Mycteria americana – USGS Patuxent Bird Identification InfoCenter
 Florida Bird Sounds at Florida Museum of Natural History
 
 

Mycteria
Birds of Cuba
Birds of Central America
Birds of the Americas
Native birds of the Southeastern United States
Birds described in 1758
ESA threatened species
Taxa named by Carl Linnaeus
Birds of Brazil